Neoconvalloside is a cardenolide glycoside extracted from Convallaria majalis.

References 

Cardenolides
Aldehydes
Rhamnosides